Qarah Bolagh (also Romanized as Qarah Bolāgh and Qareh Bolāgh; also known as Qārā Bolāgh, Qara Bulāq, Qarah Bolāgh-e Ḩowmeh Bījār, and Qareh Būlāgh) is a village in Howmeh Rural District, in the Central District of Bijar County, Kurdistan Province, Iran. At the 2006 census, its population was 21, in 4 families. The village is populated by Kurds.

References 

Towns and villages in Bijar County
Kurdish settlements in Kurdistan Province